Lewisville is a village in Monroe County, Ohio, United States. The population was 176 at the 2010 census.

Lewisville is served by the Monroe County District Library from its administrative offices in Woodsfield, Ohio.

Geography
Lewisville is located at  (39.764411, -81.216781).

Demographics

2010 census
As of the census of 2010, there were 176 people, 76 households, and 48 families living in the village. The racial makeup of the village was 98.3% White, 0.6% Asian, and 1.1% from two or more races. Hispanic or Latino of any race were 0.6% of the population.

There were 76 households, of which 25.0% had children under the age of 18 living with them, 50.0% were married couples living together, 6.6% had a female householder with no husband present, 6.6% had a male householder with no wife present, and 36.8% were non-families. 31.6% of all households were made up of individuals, and 14.5% had someone living alone who was 65 years of age or older. The average household size was 2.11 and the average family size was 2.67.

The median age in the village was 48.5 years. 17% of residents were under the age of 18; 6.2% were between the ages of 18 and 24; 23.3% were from 25 to 44; 33% were from 45 to 64; and 20.5% were 65 years of age or older. The gender makeup of the village was 46.6% male and 53.4% female.

2000 census
As of the census of 2000, there were 233 people, 95 households, and 64 families living in the village. The population density was 625.4 people per square mile (243.1/km2). There were 110 housing units at an average density of 295.2 per square mile (114.8/km2). The racial makeup of the village was 99.14% White, 0.43% Asian, and 0.43% from two or more races.

There were 95 households, out of which 28.4% had children under the age of 18 living with them, 57.9% were married couples living together, 9.5% had a female householder with no husband present, and 31.6% were non-families. 30.5% of all households were made up of individuals, and 21.1% had someone living alone who was 65 years of age or older. The average household size was 2.32 and the average family size was 2.91.

In the village, the population was spread out, with 23.6% under the age of 18, 6.4% from 18 to 24, 24.5% from 25 to 44, 24.9% from 45 to 64, and 20.6% who were 65 years of age or older. The median age was 41 years. For every 100 females there were 77.9 males. For every 100 females age 18 and over, there were 79.8 males.

The median income for a household in the village was $24,286, and the median income for a family was $31,042. Males had a median income of $33,750 versus $18,036 for females. The per capita income for the village was $11,150. About 6.5% of families and 10.1% of the population were below the poverty line, including none of those under the age of eighteen and 19.6% of those 65 or over.

References

Villages in Monroe County, Ohio
Villages in Ohio